Trocodima is a genus of moths in the family Erebidae. The genus was described by Watson in 1980.

Species
Trocodima fuscipes (Grote, 1883)
Trocodima hemiceras (Forbes, 1931)
Trocodima lenistriata (Dognin, 1906)

References

Phaegopterina
Moth genera